The 2011 Korea Open Super Series Premier was the second tournament of the 2011 BWF Super Series. It was the first competition under the new format where a select group of Super Series events were elevated to premier status. The tournament was held in Seoul, South Korea from 25 to 30 January 2011 and had a total purse of $1,200,000.

Men's singles

Seeds

  Lee Chong Wei
  Taufik Hidayat
  Peter Gade
  Chen Long
  Chen Jin
  Lin Dan
  Boonsak Ponsana
  Bao Chunlai

Top half

Bottom half

Finals

Women's singles

Seeds

  Wang Xin
  Wang Shixian
  Wang Yihan
  Saina Nehwal
  Tine Baun
  Jiang Yanjiao
  Juliane Schenk
  Bae Youn-joo

Top half

Bottom half

Finals

Men's doubles

Seeds

  Mathias Boe / Carsten Mogensen
  Koo Kien Keat / Tan Boon Heong
  Markis Kido / Hendra Setiawan
  Ko Sung-hyun / Yoo Yeon-seong
  Cai Yun / Fu Haifeng
  Jung Jae-sung / Lee Yong-dae
  Fang Chieh-min / Lee Sheng-mu
  Alvent Yulianto / Hendra Aprida Gunawan

Top half

Bottom half

Finals

Women's doubles

Seeds

  Cheng Wen-hsing / Chien Yu-chin
  Miyuki Maeda / Satoko Suetsuna
  Valeria Sorokina / Nina Vislova
 / Petya Nedelcheva / Anastasia Russkikh
  Du Jing / Pan Pan
  Wang Xiaoli / Yu Yang
  Cheng Shu / Ma Jin
  Tian Qing / Zhao Yunlei

Top half

Bottom half

Finals

Mixed doubles

Seeds

  Thomas Laybourn / Kamilla Rytter Juhl
  Sudket Prapakamol / Saralee Thoungthongkam
  Robert Mateusiak / Nadiezda Zieba
  Ko Sung-hyun / Ha Jung-eun
  Zhang Nan / Zhao Yunlei
  Tao Jiaming / Tian Qing
  Joachim Fischer Nielsen / Christinna Pedersen
  He Hanbin / Yu Yang

Top half

Bottom half

Finals

References

2011 Korea Open Super Series
Korea Super Series
2011 Korea Open Super Series
Korea Open Premier
January 2011 sports events in South Korea